Shahrak-e Shahid Bahnar Jadval-e Now (also Romanized as Shahrak-e Shahīd Bāhnar Jadval-e Now) is a village in Hasanabad Rural District, Hasanabad District, Eqlid County, Fars Province, Iran. At the 2006 census, its population was 390, in 84 families.

References 

Populated places in Eqlid County